Mathravadi is a 1956 Indian Malayalam-language film, directed and produced by P Subramaniam. The film stars Prem Nazir, Kumari Thankam in lead roles. The film had musical score by Brother Laxmanan and lyrics by Thirunainarkurichy Madhavan Nair.

Cast
 Prem Nazir as Priyan 
 Adoor Pankajam as Mayavathi
 Kottarakkara Sreedharan Nair as Mahedran 
 Aranmula Ponnamma as Susheeladevi
 Bahadoor as Vibhinan
 Kumari Thankam as Kalyani 
 S. P. Pillai as Mayadasan
 T. S. Muthaiah as Sugunan, Vinayan (double role)
 G. K. Pillai as Kalyani's father 
 Miss Kumari as Mallika
 Mavelikkara Ponnamma as Kanthimathi
Jose Prakash as Veeravarman
Kottayam Shantha as Vasanthy
 Hari as Young Priyan 
 Muttathara Soman as Mayavi
Thiruvananthapuram Lalitha as Nalini

References

External links
 

1956 films
1950s Malayalam-language films
Films directed by P. Subramaniam
Films scored by Br Lakshmanan
Indian drama films
Indian black-and-white films
1956 drama films